Eric Brodie (born 8 November 1940) is a Scottish former footballer who played as a wing half.

After playing in the Scottish League for Forfar Athletic and Dundee United, Brodie moved south in June 1963 when he joined Shrewsbury Town. Later, he also became briefly involved with Chester and Tranmere Rovers.

He also played for Mossley, signing on for the 1973–74 season in the Northern Premier League.

References

External links

1940 births
Living people
People from Blairgowrie and Rattray
Association football wing halves
Scottish footballers
Forfar Athletic F.C. players
Dundee United F.C. players
Shrewsbury Town F.C. players
Chester City F.C. players
Tranmere Rovers F.C. players
Scottish Football League players
English Football League players
Bangor City F.C. players
Mossley A.F.C. players